Vivian Hubert Howard Green (18 November 1915 – 18 January 2005) was a Fellow and Rector of Lincoln College, Oxford, a priest, author, teacher, and historian. He was also celebrated for his influence on his pupil at Sherborne School and later at Lincoln College, John le Carré, who in 1995 acknowledged him as one of the interior models for his spymaster character George Smiley.

Early life and education
Green was born at 101, Thurlby Road, Wembley, Middlesex, England, to Hubert James Green, a law stationer's clerk (son of a master tailor), and Edith Eleanor Playle, née Howard, daughter of a civil servant. The Greens ran a grocery and confectionery shop at Shanklin on the Isle of Wight, where Edith Green's family lived, from the late 1920s, formerly having had a confectionery shop at Wembley. After a few years the family settled at Minehead in Somerset; the family were moderately prosperous, and Green's mother took additional work at a home for the elderly to help send her son to Bradfield College, Berkshire. He then won a Goldsmith's scholarship to Trinity Hall, Cambridge (1933), where he achieved a first in the Tripos. At Trinity Hall, he specialised in ecclesiastical history and became the Lightfoot Scholar. Postgraduate work was done on a Gladstone Scholarship to St Deiniol's Library, Hawarden followed by a period of lecturing on ecclesiastical history at St Augustine's College, Canterbury. When asked if he had considered sitting the exams for ordination, he noted that this would pose problems as he was responsible for marking them, but he was ordained in 1939 by the Archbishop of Canterbury, Cosmo Gordon Lang.

Ecclesiastical and academic career

 1939–48 Fellow, St Augustine's College, Canterbury
 1939 Ordained Deacon
 1940 Ordained Priest
 1940–42 Chaplain, Exeter School and St Luke's College, Exeter
 1942–51 Chaplain and Assistant Master, Sherborne School
 1951–69 Chaplain, Lincoln College, Oxford
 1951–83 Fellow and Tutor in History
 1970–83 Sub-Rector
 1972–73 Acting Rector
 1983–87 Rector
 1987–2005 Honorary Fellow

Green was the only Fellow of Lincoln to vote against the college accepting women, but remained in office after the vote in 1979, becoming Rector in 1983. He left his "delightful if somewhat decaying" Grade 2*-listed fifteenth-century house, Calendars, at Burford, for the Old Prebendal House nursing home at Shipton-under-Wychwood, near Burford, where he died. He is buried in the graveyard of St Oswald's Church, Widford, Oxfordshire.

Published books
 Bishop Reginald Pecock: A Study in Ecclesiastical History and Thought (1945)
 The Hanoverians, 1714–1815 (1948)
 From St Augustine to William Temple (1948)
 Renaissance and Reformation (1952; second edition 1962)
 The Later Plantagenets: A survey of English history between 1307 and 1485 (1955)
 Oxford Common Room (1957)
 The Young Mr Wesley: A Study of John Wesley and Oxford (1961)
 The Swiss Alps (1961)
 John Wesley (1964)
 Luther and the Reformation, Batsford (1964), London: Methuen, (1969)
 Religion at Oxford and Cambridge (1964)
 The Universities (1969)
 Medieval Civilization in Western Europe (1971)
 A History of Oxford University (1974)
 The Commonwealth of Lincoln College 1427–1977 (1979)
 Love in a Cool Climate: The Letters of Mark Pattison and Meta Bradley 1879–1884 (1985)
 The Madness of Kings (1993)
 A Question of Guilt: The Murder of Nancy Eaton (1988) — co-written with William Scoular
 A New History of Christianity (1996)
 The European Reformation (1998)

Published articles 
 'The Lisles in their letters,' History Today vol.32, issue 3, March 1982
 'The Count-Duke of Olivares: The statesman in an age of decline', History Today, vol.36, issue 12, 1986

References

1915 births
2005 deaths
People from Wembley
Academics of St Augustine's College, Canterbury
Fellows of Lincoln College, Oxford
People educated at Bradfield College
20th-century English Anglican priests
Alumni of Trinity Hall, Cambridge
Rectors of Lincoln College, Oxford
20th-century English historians